Visitors to Ivory Coast must obtain a visa from one of the Ivorian diplomatic missions unless they come from one of the visa exempt countries. All visitors must hold a passport valid for 6 months.

Visa policy map

Visa exemption 
Citizens of the following 24 countries as well as refugees and stateless persons residing in these countries can visit Côte d'Ivoire without a visa:

Holders diplomatic or service category passports issued to nationals of Austria, Brazil, China, Gabon, Iran, Israel, South Africa, Turkey, Uganda, Venezuela and Vietnam do not require a visa for Côte d'Ivoire.

Airport e-Visa 

Visitors can apply online for an e-Visa that if approved can be picked up at the Port Bouet Airport in Abidjan. The eVisa is valid for 90 days and is issued within 48 hours.

Prior approval
The following countries and territories require prior approval from the Ministry of Security:

See also

 Visa requirements for Ivorian citizens

References

External links
Advice for visitors
List of countries requiring and not requiring an entry visa

Ivory Coast
Foreign relations of Ivory Coast